Cwichhelm or Cwichelm was a medieval Bishop of Rochester.

Cwichhelm was consecrated probably around 676. He resigned the see in 678, and his date of death is unknown.

Citations

References

External links
 

Bishops of Rochester
7th-century English bishops